Lateef Omotola Omidiji Jr. (born 14 September 2003) is a footballer who plays college soccer for the UNLV Rebels, as a forward. Born in the United States, he has represented both the USA and Nigeria at youth international level.

Early and personal life
Omidiji was born in Las Vegas to a Nigerian father (who is Muslim) and an American mother. His sister is Sophia Omotola Omidiji. In June 2017 he described himself as a "straight A student" who had received an award from President Obama for his grades.

Club career
Omidiji began his career at the age of 5 with the Rainbow Youth Soccer League in Las Vegas. At the age of 10 he was described as a "soccer prodigy".

He moved from FC Dordrecht to Feyenoord in 2017. He later moved to Go Ahead Eagles.

In November 2020 it was announced that Omidiji had returned to the United States to attend high school in Las Vegas, and had signed a letter of intent with the UNLV Rebels. he scored 1 goal in 16 games in the 2021 season.

International career
Omidiji is eligible to represent the United States and Nigeria.

After representing the United States at under-14, under-15 and under-16 levels, he began playing for Nigeria under-15s in May 2018. He is also eligible to represent the Netherlands. In 2019 he was dropped by the Nigeria under-17s.

References

2003 births
Living people
Nigerian footballers
American soccer players
Association football forwards
Nigeria youth international footballers
United States men's youth international soccer players
FC Dordrecht players
Feyenoord players
Go Ahead Eagles players
UNLV Rebels men's soccer players
American expatriate soccer players
Nigerian expatriate footballers
American expatriate sportspeople in the Netherlands
Nigerian expatriate sportspeople in the Netherlands
Expatriate footballers in the Netherlands